Frogger is a 1981 video game.

Frogger may also refer to:

 Frogger (franchise) game and media franchise
 Frogger video games
 Frogger (1997 video game)
 Frogger: The Great Quest (2001 video game)
 Frogger: Helmet Chaos (2005 video game)
 Frogger: Ancient Shadow (2005 video game)
 Frogger 3D (2011 video game)
 Frogger, a fictional character from the animated TV show Saturday Supercade
 Frogger, a 2021 television game show based on the video game
 "The Frogger", a Seinfeld episode
 "Frogger", a Bad Religion song from the 1985 EP Back to the Known
 Joe Frogger, traditional New England cookie

See also

 
 Frogger 2 (disambiguation)
 Frogging (disambiguation)
 Frog (disambiguation)